Cornwall Glacier may refer to:

 Cornwall Glacier (Coats Land)
 Cornwall Glacier (Ross Dependency)